Hypnodontopsis is a genus of haplolepideous mosses (Dicranidae) in family Rhachitheciaceae. 

It contains the following species (but this list may be incomplete):

 Hypnodontopsis apiculata, Z. Iwats. & Nog.

Dicranales
Moss genera
Taxonomy articles created by Polbot